Pentamedia Graphics, formerly known as Pentafour Software, is a software and digital media company based in Chennai, Tamil Nadu, India. The main activities are projects, products, consultancy and training in software and digital media.

The company has created numerous animated features, both traditionally and computer-animated, and once employed as many as 2000 employees. However, in the past few years they have laid off all but 200.

Pandavas: The Five Warriors received the National Film Award for Best Feature Film in English in 2000.Alibaba, Son of Aladdin (released as Mustafa and the Magician), The Legend of Buddha and Gulliver's Travels were shortlisted for the Academy Award for Best Animated Feature, but were not able to get a nomination.

Animated feature films

Films produced under Media Dreams

 Bharathi (2000)
 Nila Kaalam (2001)
 Pandavar Bhoomi (2001)
 Krishna Krishna (2001)
 Little John (2001)
 Pammal K. Sambandam (2002)
 Whistle (2003)

Special effects in live-action films
 Monisha En Monalisa (1999)
 Padayappa (1999)
 Kadhalar Dhinam (1999)
 Hindustan Ki Kasam (1999)
 Mudhalvan (1999)
 Bharathi (2000)
 Raju Chacha (2000)
 Nila Kaalam (2001)
 Little JOHN (2001)
 Citizen (2001)
 Pandavar Bhoomi (2001)
 Nayak: The Real Hero (2001)
 Pammal K. Sambandam (2002)
 Whistle (2003)
 Anji (2004)
 Naani (2004)
 Arjun (2004)
 M. Kumaran S/O Mahalakshmi (2004)
 Kulir 100° (2009)

Computer animation in animated films
 The King and I(1999)

See also
 Crest Animation Studios, its major Indian competitor
 Future Thought Productions
 Hanuman (2005 film)
 Indian animation industry
 List of Indian animated feature films

References

External links
 
 Interview with CEO
 Profile on Business.com
 News article

Indian animation studios
Film production companies of Tamil Nadu
Year of establishment missing